Anet Barbara Alfonso Benitez (born ) is a Cuban female volleyball player. She was part of the Cuba women's national volleyball team.

She participated in the 2013 FIVB Volleyball World Grand Prix.
On club level she played for Camaguey in 2013.

References

External links
 Profile at FIVB.org

1996 births
Living people
Cuban women's volleyball players
Place of birth missing (living people)